Khaled Akil born 1986 in Aleppo is a Syrian artist based in Istanbul. Akil is a self-taught artist who works with different art mediums. He is best known for his photography series Pokémon Go in Syria

Biography 
Khaled Akil was born in Aleppo, Syria, to a family with a long history of artistic and political influence. His father is the renowned painter Youssef Akil. His great maternal grandfather is the Syrian author and historical figure Abd al-Rahman al-Kawakibi.

ِAkil's first exhibition was held in 2009, when at the time he was completing his bachelor's degree in Law. His experience in law, politics and human rights played a major role in his artistic development and projections.

In 2012, he held a solo exhibition “The Legend of Death” in Istanbul, where he resides today due to the escalation of the war in Syria.

Solo exhibitions
 2018 Brown University, Rhode Island, U.S.
 2017 Stanford University, California, U.S.
 2013 Chalabi Art Gallery, Istanbul, Turkey
 2012 Lahd Gallery, London, UK
 2011 Karma Art Gallery, Aleppo, Syria
 2010 Mustafa Ali Art Foundation. Damascus, Syria
 2009 Sarmad Art Gallery, Aleppo, Syria

Group exhibitions
 2019 Kashash, Bozar Art Museum, Brussels, Belgium
 2018 Anti Trump Show, Creative Debuts, London, U.K. Uprooted, World Bank, Washington D.C, U.S. Contemporary Photography from the Arab World, American University Museum in Washington, Katzen Arts Center, D.C., USA.
 2016 Flight, West Branch Gallery, Stowe, Vermont, U.S. Anna&Mark art fair San Jose, California. Catharsis, Gaya Art Gallery, Sidi Bou Said.
 2015 International Discoveries V, FotoFest, Houston, Texas, United States. Woman Through The Eyes- Tajallyat Art Gallery, Beirut.  In-Quest, Gaya Art Gallery, Sidi Bou Said. Voices from the Middle East, Art in Exile Festival, Washington, D.C.
 2009 From Aleppo with Love, Le Pont Gallery, Aleppo, Syria

References

External links 
Syrian Artist’s Photographs Offer a Prayer for Peace
Syrian Artist Khaled Akil: ‘Art Flies With No Visa’
Artist Khaled Akil vows not to seek US visa under Trump
You Need to Be Looking at 'Pokémon Go in Syria - The Creators Project, VICE
Artist Khaled Akil imagines Pokémon Go in ravaged Syria | AL Jazeera EN
"The Identity Thief"- Article by Khaled Akil | The New York Times Magazine
Requiem for Syria: artist Khaled Akil on why his latest work is about peace, not war
The Syrian Art World After 2011– presented by miriam cooke 
Khaled Akil joins art team for “Aleppo, Syria: Witness to an Ancient Legacy”
 The five hottest artists from the Middle East today
 Khaled Akil: storyteller. Revealer of truths. Armed to the teeth.

Syrian male artists
Syrian contemporary artists
Nude photography
Censorship in the arts
Living people
People from Aleppo
Fine art photographers
Obscenity controversies in photography
Year of birth missing (living people)
21st-century Syrian artists